The Beijing Center for Chinese Studies (or TBC) was established by Fr. Ron Anton, SJ as a 501(c)(3) organization in 1998. TBC's mission is to promote mutual understanding between China and other cultures, while facilitating international academic opportunities for students, educators, and business professionals. The Beijing Center's school of record was first through Loyola Marymount University, followed by Loyola University-Chicago, and currently through the University of International Business and Economics (UIBE).

About The Beijing Center (TBC) 
The initial focus of TBC was cultural immersion through study abroad opportunities and short-term, faculty-led educational tours. As part of its programs, TBC introduced:

 Chinese language training
 English-taught academic courses covering a variety of subjects connected to Chinese culture
 Extended immersion through Chinese roommate pairing, Chinese peer language tutors, and Chinese family homestay opportunities
 Academic excursions within China

When first entering the TBC Beijing location at the University of International Business and Economics, there is a replica of an old Beijing alleyway or “Hutong”. There is a water garden featuring 4,000 years of Chinese water jars, the conference room displays original copies of western maps of China from 1584 to 1745, and the director's office replicates an old Ming scholar's studio.

International Education

Study Abroad in China for a Semester or Year 
At TBC, students have the opportunity to study abroad for a semester or a full year, where they will have the chance to live on the campus of the University of International Business and Economics (UIBE). Students can choose from over 20 English-taught courses each semester and take a Chinese language course appropriate for their proficiency. In addition, at the beginning of each semester, students have a 2-week long academic excursion trip – the Silk Road during fall and Yunnan Province in spring. These excursions teach students about the diverse cultures of China and offer the opportunity for personal and cultural growth.

Intern Abroad in China for a Semester or Summer 
Through the Intern Abroad programs, TBC offers semester, full-year, or summer internships for students looking to gain international working experience, learn Chinese, and experience another culture and its working environment. TBC arranges internships by working with a variety of organizations in different fields, to provide students with internships fitting of their professional goals.

ChinaContact 
The ChinaContact division runs faculty-led short-term, non-credit programs all year long. Several times a year there are programs for faculty members and for university administrators including programs for university presidents. There are workshops and courses for undergraduate classes, MBA groups, and graduate humanities classes.

Research Center 
TBC Research Center specializes in supporting primary source research and helping young Chinese scholars in the doctoral or post-doc years. The center's scholar-in-residence helps TBC students with academic projects during their stay in Beijing.

The Beijing Center Press 
The Beijing Center Press specializes in publishing unique works on China-related topics, such as politics, philosophy, art, history, culture, religion, sciences, current affairs, etc. In partnership with Amazon's KDP, all TBC works are published and available online at amazon.com. TBC Press publishes works in both Chinese and English.

The Anton Library 
The Anton Library houses a collection of 27,000 volumes about Chinese life and society. Special collections include a small rare book collection of 17th century volumes that first revealed China to the West, a collection of approximately 3,000 older books from 1800 to 1949, and a multilingual collection on the history of the Catholic Church in China. The main collection of books about China written in English is the largest private such collection in Beijing and one of the largest in China.

"How The West Learned of China" collection 
The TBC Library of Chinese Studies has obtained a few original copies of these works in its collection entitled: "How the West Learned of China". The collection dates from 1588 until 1840 (with a few later exceptions).
"How The West Learned of China" collection list

Historical collection 
The collection has 1,200 books from the early 19th century to the founding of the People's Republic of China. Many books were published in the Qing Dynasty and some are considered rare or collectors items.

Christian History collection 
This is a multilingual collection mainly of primary sources from around the world on early Christian history in China. Works here are in Chinese, Latin, Portuguese, Dutch, German, Spanish, French, etc. (not English). It contains the work of early Dominicans, Franciscans, Jesuits and others as well as works from the early local church in China.

See also
 List of Jesuit sites

External links
 The Beijing Center for Chinese Studies
 Beijing University of International Business and Economics

Education in China
Study abroad programs
1998 establishments in China